Wippe may refer to:

 Wippe (Rhedaer Bach), a river of North Rhine-Westphalia, Germany, tributary of the Rhedaer Bach
 De Wippe, a windmill in Hellendoorn, in the Dutch province of Overijssel
 Wippe, a quarter of Solingen, Germany